A cornette is a piece of female headwear. It is essentially a type of wimple consisting of a large, starched piece of white cloth that is folded upward in such a way as to create the resemblance of horns on the wearer's head. It remained fashionable for some Parisian ladies around 1800, wearing ones made of muslin or gauze and richly ornamented with lace.

Use by the Daughters of Charity
The cornette was retained as a distinctive piece of clothing into modern times by the Daughters of Charity, a Roman Catholic society of apostolic life founded by St. Vincent de Paul in the mid-17th century. The founder wanted to have the sisters of this new type of religious congregation of women, that tended to the sick and poor, and were not required to remain in their cloister, resemble ordinary middle-class women as much as possible in their clothing, including the wearing of the cornette.

After the cornette generally fell into disuse, it became a distinctive feature of the Daughters of Charity, making theirs one of the most widely recognized religious habits. Because of the cornette, they were known in Ireland as the "butterfly nuns". In the United States, the Daughters of Charity wore wide, white cornettes for 114 years, from 1850 to 1964. With the Second Ecumenical Council of the Vatican (Vatican II), the nun's habits were modernized to return to a clothing that better reflected their charitable role, working with the poor and infirm.

In popular culture
The 1967 television series The Flying Nun features American actress Sally Field as Sister Bertrille, who is able to fly due to her light weight and the heavily starched cornette.

See also
 List of headgear
 Bandeau (headwear)
 Coif
 Guimpe
 Wimple

References

External links

History of clothing (Western fashion)
Headgear
Catholic religious clothing
Religious headgear